Zlotshev can refer to:

Zolochiv, Lviv Oblast, Ukraine
Złoczew, Poland
Zlotshov (Hasidic dynasty), a Hasidic dynasty founded in Zolochiv